Borbo chagwa, the Chagwa swift or Chagwa skipper, is a butterfly in the family Hesperiidae. It is found in Uganda, Tanzania, Mozambique and eastern Zimbabwe. The habitat consists of forests.

Adults have been recorded on wing in spring and autumn.

References

Butterflies described in 1937
Hesperiinae